Quartet: Live at Moers Festival is a live album by saxophonist/composer/improviser Anthony Braxton's Quartet recorded in 1974 at the Third International New Jazz Festival in Moers and originally released on the German Ring label in 1976 and the Moers Music label in 1977 as a double LP.

Track listing
All compositions by Anthony Braxton are graphically titled and the following attempts to translate the title to text.

 "6-------77--(NJD)--T AR--36K [Composition 23 B]" - 26:23
 "489M 70-2--(THB) M [Composition 23 E]" - 21:50
 "84°--KELVIN--M [Composition 40 O] Part I" - 1:42
 "84°--KELVIN--M [Composition 40 O] Part II" - 9:00
 "BOR---N-K64 (60)--M 0 H S [Composition 40 M]" - 18:15
 "F64-- H488 [Composition 23 F]" - 10:08
 "RBHM-F KNNK  [Composition 23 D]" - 10:59

Personnel
Anthony Braxton - reeds
Kenny Wheeler - trumpet (tracks 2-7)
Dave Holland - bass
Barry Altschul - drums, percussion

References

Moers Music live albums
Anthony Braxton live albums
1976 live albums